Levan Kebadze (born 1 February 1975) is a former football striker from Georgia.

1975 births
Living people
Footballers from Tbilisi
Association football forwards
Footballers from Georgia (country)
FC Dinamo Tbilisi players
FC Torpedo Kutaisi players
PAS Giannina F.C. players
Iraklis Thessaloniki F.C. players
Enosis Neon Paralimni FC players
Ethnikos Achna FC players
Omonia Aradippou players
Erovnuli Liga players
Super League Greece players
Cypriot First Division players
Cypriot Second Division players
Expatriate footballers from Georgia (country)
Expatriate footballers in Greece
Expatriate footballers in Cyprus
Expatriate sportspeople from Georgia (country) in Greece
Expatriate sportspeople from Georgia (country) in Cyprus